Thomas & Friends is a children's television series about the engines and other characters working on the railways of the Island of Sodor, and is based on The Railway Series books written by the Reverend W. Awdry.

This article lists and details episodes from the eighteenth series of the show, which was first broadcast in 2014. Some episodes in this series have two titles: the original titles are indicated in bold, with the American-adapted titles underneath. This series was narrated by Mark Moraghan for audiences in the United Kingdom and United States.

In April 2014, five episodes (Thomas the Quarry Engine, Not So Slow Coaches, Flatbeds of Fear, Disappearing Diesels, and Toad's Adventure) were released exclusively on the DVD "Trouble on the Tracks".

A new DVD ("The Christmas Engines") was released in the U.S. on 28 October 2014. It contains the five episodes The Perfect Gift, Duncan the Humbug, Last Train for Christmas, Duck in the Water and Long Lost Friend. 

In January 2015, another DVD (Dinos and Discoveries) (containing six more episodes) was released, prior to their official broadcast (from 27 to 31 July, six months later).

This series was also the last to utilize the new series intro and credits and also the original Engine Roll Call in the US/UK broadcasts. Starting from Season 19, it utilizes the remix version of the Engine Roll Call and the theme tune.

Episodes

Voice cast

Joe Mills (Oliver and Toad), Tom Stourton (Duncan), Maggie Ollerenshaw (Henrietta) and Robert Wilfort (Samson) joined the cast, along with Tim Whitnall (Timothy and Reg), Olivia Colman (Marion) and Clive Mantle (Gator) (from that season's special) officially.

Notes

References

2014 American television seasons
2015 American television seasons
Thomas & Friends seasons
2014 British television seasons
2015 British television seasons